Graham Gilchrist (14 August 1932 – 24 June 2015) was an Australian rules footballer who played for  from 1952 to 1961.

He captained the Under 19 team to a premiership in 1951, and played in the reserves premiership team in 1952.

References

External links

1932 births
2015 deaths
Carlton Football Club players
Australian rules footballers from Victoria (Australia)